White Settlement may refer to one of the following places:
White Settlement, Nova Scotia
White Settlement, Texas

See also
European colonization of the Americas